Nikolay Kolev (born 24 January 1978) is a Bulgarian weightlifter. He competed in the men's middle heavyweight event at the 2004 Summer Olympics.

References

1978 births
Living people
Bulgarian male weightlifters
Olympic weightlifters of Bulgaria
Weightlifters at the 2004 Summer Olympics
Sportspeople from Plovdiv